Vyacheslav Anatolyevich Damdintsurunov (born September 21, 1977, Katangar, Petrovsk-Zabaykalsky District) is a Russian political figure, professional sportsman, and a deputy of the 8th State Duma. 

Damdintsurunov is a professional sportsman; in 1999, he became the Russian champion in Muay Thai.  Damdintsurunov had been working for more than 13 years on developing and implementing sports policies in the region. Damdintsurunov is also a former vice-rector of the Russian State University of Physical Education, Sport, Youth and Tourism. In 2017, he was appointed the Minister of Sports and Youth Policy of Buryatia. He resigned in 2021 after he was elected a deputy from the Buryatia constituency of the State Duma of the 8th convocation.

Vyacheslav Damdintsurunov is married and has three children.

Awards 

 Order "For Merit to the Fatherland"

References

1977 births
Living people
People from Zabaykalsky Krai
United Russia politicians
21st-century Russian politicians
Eighth convocation members of the State Duma (Russian Federation)